Evald Konno (13 February 1897 Tartu – 20 April 1942 Sevurallag, Sverdlovsk Oblast) was an Estonian politician and lawyer. He was a member of VI Riigikogu (its Chamber of Deputies).

References

1897 births
1942 deaths
Members of the Estonian National Assembly
Members of the Riigivolikogu
20th-century Estonian lawyers
University of Tartu alumni
Estonian military personnel of the Estonian War of Independence
Estonian people executed by the Soviet Union
Politicians from Tartu